Nathan J. Smith (born August 7, 1983) is an American professional golfer.

Smith was born in Santa Monica, California. He played at Soquel High and transferred to Stevenson School in Pebble Beach, where he also played golf two seasons. He played college golf at Duke University where he was a two-time All-American. He turned professional after graduating in 2006.

Smith played on the mini-tours from 2006 to 2008. He joined the Challenge Tour in 2009 via qualifying school. He joined the Nationwide Tour in 2010 and won his first title in September at the WNB Golf Classic.

Smith just missed out on an automatic PGA Tour card, finishing 27th on the 2010 Nationwide Tour. He later earned his card through qualifying school.

Professional wins (1)

Nationwide Tour wins (1)

See also
2010 PGA Tour Qualifying School graduates

References

External links

American male golfers
Duke Blue Devils men's golfers
PGA Tour golfers
European Tour golfers
Golfers from Santa Monica, California
People from Soquel, California
1983 births
Living people